This is a list of bestselling novels in the United States in the 2010s, as determined by Publishers Weekly. The list features the most popular novels of each year from 2010 through to 2019.

The standards set for inclusion in the lists – which, for example, led to the exclusion of the novels in the Harry Potter series from the lists for the 1990s and 2000s – are currently unknown.  After 2012, Publishers Weekly used the lists from Nielsen BookScan for print, supplemented by the Amazon.com lists for Kindle and print. Some of the lists of print bestsellers have combined the different formats of books into one list. Books that are not novels will be excluded when possible, especially nonfiction books.

According to Nielsen BookScan data, the Fifty Shades series the top three-best selling books of the decade, with the first novel selling 15.2 million copies from 2010 to 2019.  The Hunger Games (2008) was fourth (8.7 million copies) followed by The Help (2009) (8.7 million).

2010
 The Girl Who Kicked the Hornet's Nest by Stieg Larsson
 The Confession by John Grisham
 The Help by Kathryn Stockett
 Safe Haven by Nicholas Sparks
 Dead or Alive by Tom Clancy
 Sizzling Sixteen by Janet Evanovich
 Cross Fire by James Patterson
 Freedom by Jonathan Franzen
 Port Mortuary by Patricia Cornwell
 Full Dark, No Stars by Stephen King

2011
The Litigators by John Grisham
11/22/63 by Stephen King
The Best of Me by Nicholas Sparks
Smokin' Seventeen by Janet Evanovich
A Dance with Dragons by George R. R. Martin
Explosive Eighteen by Janet Evanovich
Kill Alex Cross by James Patterson
Micro by Michael Crichton
Dead Reckoning by Charlaine Harris
Locked On by Tom Clancy and Mark Greaney

2012
Fifty Shades of Grey by E. L. James
The Hunger Games by Suzanne Collins
Fifty Shades Darker by E. L. James
Fifty Shades Freed by E. L. James
Catching Fire by Suzanne Collins
Mockingjay by Suzanne Collins
Diary of a Wimpy Kid: The Third Wheel by Jeff Kinney
Fifty Shades trilogy box set by E. L. James
The Mark of Athena by Rick Riordan
Gone Girl by Gillian Flynn

2013
 Diary of a Wimpy Kid: Hard Luck by Jeff Kinney
 Inferno by Dan Brown
 The House of Hades by Rick Riordan
 Divergent by Veronica Roth
 Sycamore Row by John Grisham
 Diary of a Wimpy Kid: The Third Wheel by Jeff Kinney
 Allegiant by Veronica Roth
 The Fault in Our Stars by John Green
 Doctor Sleep by Stephen King
 The Great Gatsby by F. Scott Fitzgerald

2014
 The Fault in Our Stars (trade paperback) by John Green
 Diary of a Wimpy Kid: The Long Haul by Jeff Kinney
 Divergent by Veronica Roth
 Insurgent by Veronica Roth
 Killing Patton by Bill O'Reilly
 Allegiant by Veronica Roth
 Gone Girl by Gillian Flynn
 The Fault in Our Stars (movie tie-in) by John Green
 The Fault in Our Stars (hardcover) by John Green
 Frozen by Victoria Saxon

2015
Go Set a Watchman by Harper Lee
Grey by E. L. James 
The Girl on the Train by Paula Hawkins 
All the Light We Cannot See by Anthony Doerr 
The Martian (trade paper) by Andy Weir 
Rogue Lawyer by John Grisham 
To Kill a Mockingbird by Harper Lee  
See Me by Nicholas Sparks
Gray Mountain by John Grisham
The Nightingale by Kristin Hannah

2016
The Girl on the Train (trade paperback) by Paula Hawkins
A Man Called Ove by Fredrik Backman
The Whistler by John Grisham
Me Before You (trade paperback) by Jojo Moyes
Me Before You (movie tie-in) by Jojo Moyes
Two by Two by Nicholas Sparks
The Girl on the Train by Paula Hawkins (movie tie-in)
To Kill a Mockingbird by Harper Lee
Me Before You (movie tie-in) by Jojo Moyes
All the Light We Cannot See by Anthony Doerr

2017
Wonder by R.J. Palacio
Milk and Honey by Rupi Kaur
Diary of a Wimpy Kid: The Getaway by Jeff Kinney
Origin by Dan Brown
You Are a Badass by Jen Sincero
A Man Called Ove by Fredrik Backman
Oh, the Places You'll Go! by Dr. Seuss
The Woman in Cabin 10 by Ruth Ware
The Rooster Bar by John Grisham
Camino Island by John Grisham

2018
Diary of a Wimpy Kid: The Meltdown by Jeff Kinney
The Wonky Donkey by Craig Smith
Dog Man and Cat Kid by Dav Pilkey
The President Is Missing by Bill Clinton and James Patterson
Dog Man by Dav Pilkey
A Wrinkle in Time by Madeleine L’Engle
Crazy Rich Asians by Kevin Kwan
The Reckoning by John Grisham
A Day in the Life of Marlon Bundo by Jill Twiss
Oh, the Places You'll Go! by Dr. Seuss

2019
Where the Crawdads Sing by Delia Owens
Dog Man: For Whom the Ball Rolls by Dav Pilkey
Diary of a Wimpy Kid: Wrecking Ball by Jeff Kinney
Dog Man: Brawl of the Wild by Dav Pilkey
Diary of an Awesome Friendly Kid by Jeff Kinney
The Tattooist of Auschwitz by Heather Morris
Dog Man: Fetch 22 by Dav Pilkey
The Guardians by John Grisham
The Institute by Stephen King
Guts by Raina Telgemeier

References

Publishers Weekly bestselling novels series
Novels
Novels
2010s books